Hymn for My Soul is the twentieth studio album by Joe Cocker, released in 2007. It was produced by Ethan Johns. Musicians on these special sessions included Tom Petty & The Heartbreakers' Benmont Tench, legendary drummer Jim Keltner, Mike Finnigan, ace guitarist Albert Lee, Dave Palmer, Greg Leisz, James Gadson, Bob Babbitt and Johns. The songs include Cocker's signatures on George Harrison's "Beware of Darkness", Bob Dylan's "Ring Them Bells", John Fogerty's "Long As I Can See The Light" and Stevie Wonder's "You Haven't Done Nothin'".

The album reached No. 9 on the UK Albums Chart, becoming Cocker's highest-charting album in the UK along with Have a Little Faith (1994).

Track listing
 "You Haven't Done Nothin'" – 3:50 (Stevie Wonder)
 "One Word (Peace)" – 2:49 (John Magnie, Tommy Malone)
 "Love Is For Me" – 4:05 (Ziggy Modeliste, Art Neville, Leo Nocentelli, George Porter Jr.)
 "Don't Give Up on Me" – 4:05 (Hoy Lindsey, Dan Penn, Carson Whitsett)
 "Long as I Can See the Light" – 3:34 (John Fogerty)
 "Beware of Darkness" – 3:51 (George Harrison)
 "Just Pass It On" – 4:39 (Daniel Moore)
 "Rivers Invitation" – 3:31 (Percy Mayfield)
 "Ring Them Bells" – 3:04 (Bob Dylan)
 "Hymn for My Soul" – 3:54 (Andy Fairweather Low)
 "Come Together" (John Lennon, Paul McCartney) – 4:25 – US edition bonus track
 "Hymn for My Soul" (instrumental) – 3:54 (Andy Fairweather Low) – Single B side

Personnel 
 Joe Cocker – vocals
 Mike Finnigan – Hammond B3 organ (1, 2, 4, 6, 8, 10)
 Dave Palmer – Wurlitzer electric piano (1, 2, 6), acoustic piano (4), pipe organ (5, 6), keyboards (7, 9)
 Benmont Tench – acoustic piano (1-3, 5-10)
 Ethan Johns – guitar (1-3, 8), string arrangements (3, 5), harmonium (5), hurdy-gurdy (5), acoustic guitar (6), lead guitar (6), backing vocals (6), ukulele (7)
 Greg Leisz – guitar (5, 7), steel guitar (6, 9), mandolin (10)
 Albert Lee – guitar (10)
 Bob Babbitt – bass (1-4, 6-8, 10)
 James Gadson – drums (1-3, 7, 8, 10)
 Don Heffington – congas (1, 2, 8), triangle (2), vibraslap (2)
 Jim Keltner – percussion (2), drums (4, 6)
 Tom Scott – saxophone (1)
 Greg Adams – trumpet (1)
 Chuck Findley – trumpet (1)
 David Low – cello (3, 5)
 Brian Denbow – viola (3)
 Julie Gigante – violin (3)
 Phillipe Levy – violin (3)
 Merry Clayton – backing vocals (2, 3, 10)
 Jim Gilstrap – backing vocals (2, 3, 7, 10)
 Julianna Raye – backing vocals (2, 6)
 Tata Vega – backing vocals (2, 3, 10)
 Julia Waters – backing vocals (2, 3, 10)
 Oren Waters – backing vocals (2, 3, 7, 10)
 Benjamin Ochieng – backing vocals (7)

Production 
 Ethan Johns – producer, engineer, mixing 
 Billy Mims – assistant engineer
 Neil Comber – mix assistant
 Dan Porter – mix assistant
 Tim Young – mastering
 Ryan Corey – art direction, design
 Jeri Heiden – art direction, design
 Jennifer Johns – photography
 Andrew McPherson – photography

Charts

Certifications

References

2007 albums
Joe Cocker albums
EMI Records albums
Covers albums
Albums produced by Ethan Johns